István Nagy (born 6 October 1967) is a Hungarian agricultural engineer and politician who has served as Minister of Agriculture since 2018.

Profession
Nagy was born in Újfehértó, where he spent his childhood and attended elementary school. He finished his secondary studies at the János Balásházy Agricultural Secondary School in Debrecen in 1986. He attended the Pannon University of Agricultural Sciences, Faculty of Agricultural Sciences in Mosonmagyaróvár, where earned a degree of agrarian engineer in 1992. He graduated from the Faculty of Natural and Social Sciences of the Budapest University of Technology (BME) as an engineering teacher in 1996. He received a PhD degree at the Imre Ujhelyi Doctoral School of Zoology at the University of West Hungary (NYME) in 2007.

Between January 1, 1993, and August 15, 1994, he taught animal husbandry and feeding at the Péter Veres Agricultural Vocational High School. Then he joined the academic staff of the Faculty of Agricultural Sciences of the University of the Pannon University of Agricultural Sciences, then after the 2000 transformations, the University of West Hungary in Mosonmagyaróvár. He taught beekeeping, rabbit and fur animal husbandry and professional methodology.

Political career
Nagy served as deputy mayor of Mosonmagyaróvár from 2006 to 2010. He is a member of the National Assembly (MP) for Mosonmagyaróvár (Győr-Moson-Sopron County Constituency IV then V) since 2010. He was elected mayor of Mosonmagyaróvár as the candidate of the Fidesz in the 2010 local elections. He held that position until June 2014, when he was appointed Parliamentary Secretary of State for Agriculture on June 15, 2014.

Nagy was a member of the Committee on Audit Office and Budget from May 14, 2010, to May 5, 2014, and of the Committee on Agriculture from September 23, 2013, to June 18, 2014. He was also a vice-chairman of the latter committee for a short time between May and June 2014.

Following the 2018 parliamentary election, Nagy was appointed Minister of Agriculture in the Fourth Orbán Government, replacing Sándor Fazekas. He retained his position in the Fifth Orbán Government too.

Personal life
He is married to Dr Istvánné Nagy. They have together two children — a daughter, Veronika, and a son, István.

References

1967 births
Living people
Hungarian engineers
Fidesz politicians
Agriculture ministers of Hungary
Mayors of places in Hungary
Members of the National Assembly of Hungary (2010–2014)
Members of the National Assembly of Hungary (2014–2018)
Members of the National Assembly of Hungary (2018–2022)
Members of the National Assembly of Hungary (2022–2026)
People from Újfehértó
Members of the Fourth Orbán Government
Members of the fifth Orbán government